John F. Healy ( – 25 April 2012) was a senior scholar and graduate of Trinity College, Cambridge. He served in the Army (Intelligence Corps) then entered an academic career in Classics/Classical Archaeology at Manchester and London Universities. He was the sometime curator of Greek coins at Manchester Museum and President of the Windsor Art Society. He was Dean of the Faculties of Arts and Music and Chairman of the combined Classics Departments of Royal Holloway, University of London and Bedford College, London. He was Emeritus Professor of Classics, University of London and the author of numerous books and articles.

Bibliography

Books

Articles
The Art of Persuasion in Greece (with G. Kennedy), Journal of Hellenistic Studies 86:189 (1966)

Biography
Healy was born in England. He attended Battersea Grammar School. At the outbreak of World War II, his family were evacuated to Worthing, and then to Hertford. When his father (who worked for The Admiralty) was transferred from London to Bath, the family joined him there, and Healy's education continued at the City of Bath Boys School. He gained an entrance to Cambridge University, but after one year he was called into the military. As a Captain in the Army Intelligence Corps (beginning 1943) he was stationed in India, then in Singapore. He was an interpreter in the Japanese War Crimes Trial.

In 1949 Healy left military service, returning to his studies. He was a senior scholar and graduate of Trinity College (Cambridge). In 1954 he earned a Ph.D. in Classics and Archaeology at Manchester University. He remained there as literature lecturer, then moved to Bedford College in 1961, as Reader in Greek.

In 1966 Healy began working at Royal Holloway College at the University of London, as Professor of Classics. He was Head of the Department of Classics, then Dean of the Faculty of Arts (1978-1981), then Chairman of the Department of Classics (1985-199). He retired from Holloway in 1990.

In 1957 Healy married Carol Ann McEvoy (b. ca 1934) (whose father had founded Kellogg Co. of Great Britain). Their son John Matthew Healy was born in October 1964.

Healy was the unofficial curator of Greek coins at Manchester Museum, and served as President of the Windsor Art Society. He also lectured occasionally on Swans Hellenic and Royal Viking Line cruises.

In retirement Healy and his second wife resided in Macclesfield, Cheshire. He continued lecturing at locations throughout Europe, the USA and the Far East.

References

Alumni of Trinity College, Cambridge
British non-fiction writers
Living people
British curators
British male writers
Year of birth uncertain
Male non-fiction writers
Year of birth missing (living people)